|}

The Autumn Stakes is a Group 3 flat horse race in Great Britain open to two-year-old horses. It is run on the Rowley Mile at Newmarket over a distance of 1 mile (1,609 metres), and it is scheduled to take place each year in October.

History
The event was established in 1987, and it was originally held at Ascot. The inaugural running was abandoned because of a waterlogged course. For a period the race held Listed status, and it was promoted to Group 3 level in 2003.

The Autumn Stakes was transferred to Newmarket in 2011. It became part of a new fixture called Future Champions Day but from 2014 it moved to be run at the same fixture as the Cesarewitch Handicap. Since 2015 it has formed part of the revamped Future Champions Festival at Newmarket.

The leading horses from the race sometimes go on to compete in the Racing Post Trophy. The last to win both was Kingston Hill in 2013.

Records

Leading jockey (5 wins):
 William Buick - Gifted Master (2015), Ghaiyyath (2017), One Ruler (2020), Coroebus (2021), Silver Knott (2022)

Leading trainer (4 wins):
 Charlie Appleby - Ghaiyyath	(2017), One Ruler (2020), Coroebus (2021), Silver Knott (2022)

Winners

See also
 Horse racing in Great Britain
 List of British flat horse races

References
 Racing Post:

 galopp-sieger.de – Autumn Stakes.
 ifhaonline.org – International Federation of Horseracing Authorities – Autumn Stakes (2019).
 pedigreequery.com – Autumn Stakes.

Flat races in Great Britain
Newmarket Racecourse
Flat horse races for two-year-olds
Recurring sporting events established in 1987
1987 establishments in England